Ellisburg is an unincorporated community and census-designated place (CDP) located within Cherry Hill Township, in Camden County, New Jersey, United States. As of the 2010 United States Census, the CDP's population was 8,168. The area had been part of the combined Erlton-Ellisburg CDP, which was discontinued after the 2000 Census.

History
Named for the prominent Ellis family who settled the area, the area that came to be known as Ellisburg was first the site of a blacksmith and tavern, which soon brought private homes to the area. A stagecoach that stopped at the tavern further helped development. The initial location of Ellisburg was the crossroads of Cooper's Creek Road (now Route 70) and Haddonfield Moorestown Road (King's Highway).

Geography
According to the United States Census Bureau, the CDP had a total area of 0.905 square miles (2.344 km2), all of which was land.

Demographics

2010 Census

References

Census-designated places in Camden County, New Jersey
Neighborhoods in Cherry Hill, New Jersey